Geumsa Station is an underground station of the Busan Metro Line 4 in Geumsahoedong-dong, Geumjeong District, Busan, South Korea.

Station layout

Vicinity
Exit 1: S-oil
Exit 2:
Exit 3: Geumjeong Furniture
Exit 4: Geumsa Bus Stop

External links
  Cyber station information from Busan Transportation Corporation

Busan Metro stations
Geumjeong District
Railway stations opened in 2011